Drummondita is a genus of flowering plants belonging to the family Rutaceae.

Its native range is Southwestern and Northern Australia.

The genus name of Drummondita is derived from Thomas Drummond (1780–1835) and his brother James Drummond (1787–1863).

Species:

Drummondita borealis 
Drummondita calida 
Drummondita ericoides 
Drummondita fulva 
Drummondita hassellii 
Drummondita longifolia 
Drummondita microphylla 
Drummondita miniata 
Drummondita rubroviridis 
Drummondita wilsonii

References

Zanthoxyloideae
Zanthoxyloideae genera